Farrash Kola-ye Sofla (also Romanized as Farrāsh Kolā-ye Soflá; also known as Farrāsh Kolā and Farrāsh Kolā-ye Pā’īn) is a village in Kalej Rural District, in the Central District of Nowshahr County, Mazandaran Province, Iran. At the 2006 census, its population was 264, in 73 families.

References 

Populated places in Nowshahr County